, is a Japanese athlete from Tokyo. He holds the Guinness World Record for running 100 meters on all four limbs, setting a best time of 15.71 seconds in the Komazawa Olympic Park in Tokyo, 6 November 2015, shaving 0.15 seconds off the previous record of 15.86 seconds by Katsumi Tamakoshi. Before Tamakoshi's record, Ito also held the record of 16.87 seconds, set on 14 November 2013. He also held the record before that, having set a time of 17.47 seconds on 15 November 2012, and the record before that of 18.58 seconds in 2008.
Ito spent nine years studying how animals like African patas monkeys move. He used to work as a janitor and mopped floors on all fours to practice his four-limbed running technique. As of 2016, he runs a company dealing in solar energy. He can be seen chasing a man in the "My Love Is My Disease" video by Australian band The Jezabels.

References

External links
 Personal blog 

1982 births
Living people
Japanese male sprinters